Emma Laird is a Scottish actress who played roles in short films From Life (2018) and In Conversation With a Goddess (2019). She played Iris, a main role, in the 2021 Paramount+ streaming series Mayor of Kingstown. Additionally, Laird has been listed as one of the "10 Brits to Watch" in 2021 by Variety.

Career
Laird began her career with roles in short films From Life and In Conversation With a Goddess. In April 2021, she was cast in a leading role in Paramount+ series Mayor of Kingstown as Iris, "a dancer who uses her charms to her benefit, until those charms are used against her".The Hollywood Reporter described her handling of concurrent offers as "li[ghting] up the town's buzz meter". In October 2021, Variety included Laird in their annual list of "10 Brits to Watch".

Filmography

References

External links

21st-century British actresses
British film actresses
British television actresses
Living people
1998 births